The York Assembly Rooms is an 18th-century assembly rooms building in York, England, originally used as a place for high class social gatherings in the city. The building is situated on Blake Street and is a Grade I listed building. 

Designed by Richard Boyle, 3rd Earl of Burlington it is one of the earliest Palladian buildings in Northern England and possibly the earliest neoclassical building in Europe. Construction began in 1730 and was completed in 1735, but it was used beginning in 1732. After a fire in 1773, alterations were made to the Lesser Assembly Room to the designs of Sir John O'Corall. The front steps of the portico were later replaced by an internal set in 1791. Lord Burlington's original front facade was replaced in 1828 by a Greek Revival portico designed by J. P. Pritchett. 

In 1925, York Corporation purchased the building and made further alterations in 1939 through 1951. The York Conservation Trust purchased the Assembly Rooms in 2002 and are responsible for the building's maintenance. 

It currently operates as an Ask Italian but is open for public viewing.

References

External links

Assembly Rooms page on the site of York Conservation Trust
Assembly Rooms page on the site History of York

Assembly rooms
Grade I listed buildings in York
Grade I listed assembly rooms
Dance venues in England